The Queen of Babylon is a 1954 Italian film set in the Neo-Babylonian Empire in the year 600 BC.

This film was directed by Carlo Ludovico Bragaglia.

Plot
Semiramis, a simple keeper of goats, is taken to Babylon for having lodged Amal, the leader of the Chaldeans, pursued by King Ashur. She is noticed by the latter, who would like to make her his favorite. But the beauty has thoughts only for her attractive Amal who managed to escape and comes to visit her discreetly at the palace. Captured again, Amal escapes death thanks to Semiramis who gives in to the king, and he finds himself with his compatriots to toil in the quarries. The deceit of Sibari, the Prime Minister, will change his fate.

Cast
Rhonda Fleming as Semiramis
Ricardo Montalbán as Amal (credited as Ricardo Montalban)
Roldano Lupi as Assur
Carlo Ninchi as Sibari
Tamara Lees as Lysia
Furio Meniconi as Bolgias 
Gildo Bocci

See also
 I Am Semiramis
 War Gods of Babylon

References

External links
 

1950s historical films
1954 films
1950s adventure drama films
1950s action adventure films
English-language Italian films
1950s Italian-language films
Films set in the 7th century BC
Historical epic films
Italian historical adventure films
Italian action adventure films
Films set in ancient Mesopotamia
Films about royalty
Films about queens
Peplum films
Films directed by Carlo Ludovico Bragaglia
Films set in Babylon
Films set in Babylonia
Sword and sandal films
20th Century Fox films
Films scored by Renzo Rossellini
1950s Italian films
Semiramis